Eugene (Max) Mekilok (born August 31, 1934) is a Canadian former professional hockey player who played 343 games in the Western Hockey League for the Spokane Comets. He also played 18 games for the Rochester Americans in the American Hockey League.

External links
 

1934 births
Living people
Sportspeople from Thunder Bay
Ice hockey people from Ontario
Spokane Comets players
Rochester Americans players
Canadian ice hockey centres